Uranothauma delatorum is a butterfly in the family Lycaenidae. It is found in southern Sudan, Ethiopia, Uganda, Kenya (the western part of the country and the central highlands), the Democratic Republic of the Congo (from the eastern part of the country to Ituri and Kivu), Burundi and western and northern Tanzania. The habitat consists of forests.

Adult males mud-puddle and are attracted to cow and horse manure.

The larvae feed on Albizia gummifera and Acacia species. They feed on the young shoots of their host plant. They are green or pink with a dark dorsal line.

References

Butterflies described in 1909
Uranothauma